Pediasia trisecta, the large sod webworm or greater sod webworm, is a moth of the family Crambidae. It is found in the United States and southern Canada.

The wingspan is 23–33 mm. Adults are on wing from May to October. Adults feed solely on dew.

The larvae feed on various Poaceae species. They overwinter as young larvae in silk-lined tubes under the soil. In early spring, they feed on the upper root systems, stems and blades of their host plant from under protective silken webs. Pupation takes place in May in underground silken cocoons. These cocoons incorporate bits of plants and soil.

References

Moths described in 1856
Crambini
Moths of North America